Annette Ellerbracke (born 7 November 1949) is a German volleyball player. She competed in the women's tournament at the 1972 Summer Olympics.

References

External links
 

1949 births
Living people
German women's volleyball players
Olympic volleyball players of West Germany
Volleyball players at the 1972 Summer Olympics
People from Gütersloh
Sportspeople from Detmold (region)